WSTE-DT (channel 7), branded on air as Teleisla, is a Spanish-language independent television station serving San Juan, Puerto Rico, that is licensed to Ponce. It is owned by TelevisaUnivision. The station maintains its studios on Calle Carazo in Guaynabo. To provide island-wide coverage, WSTE maintains a network of five transmitter sites, located at Cerro Maravilla in Ponce, at Cerro La Marquesa in Aguas Buenas, at Cerro Canta Gallo in Aguada, on Highway 22 in Arecibo, and at the Monte del Estado in San Germán.

History

WRIK-TV

The station first signed on as WRIK-TV on February 2, 1958, after receiving the FCC permit to go on the air on channel 7. It was the first television station in Ponce, and the fourth in Puerto Rico, after WKAQ-TV, WAPA-TV (both were established four years earlier), and WORA-TV (established three years earlier). It was owned by Alfredo Ramírez de Arellano. Its news director was Manuel Morales-Flores, with Felix Suria as production manager and Edmund Reid as its chief engineer. The station maintained a transmitter—originally located at El Vigía—and studios at the Edificio Darlington—the first high-rise building in Ponce, completed in 1952. Two years later, the transmitter was relocated to the Hotel Ponce Intercontinental.

WRIK-TV operated as a Spanish-language independent station; it carried some 18 daily programs, including news, movies, cartoons, and soap operas, among others. One notable show, airing in the late afternoons, was El Show de Tío Carlitos. In 1964, the station's staff had expanded to include George A. Mayoral, president, general manager William Cortada, commercial manager and news director Luis A. "Wito" Morales, promotional manager Monsita M. Diaz, and chief engineer Americo Cintron. The transmitter was relocated atop Cerro Maravilla in 1967.

Rikavisión
In 1969, Ramírez de Arellano announced the sale of 80 percent of WRIK-TV to United Artists Corporation for a reported $7 million. Under United Artists, WRIK began operating from color-equipped studios in Ponce and San Juan and rebranded as Rikavisión. The station's logo was a rooster. From San Juan, the station broadcast El Show de Tito Rodriguez for two seasons; the station also produced Ahi Va Eso (with Awilda Carbia, Jacobo Morales and Norma Candal), Contigo Anexo 3 (which included a young Lou Briel), Showtime (with Wilkins), Las Caribelles, El Show de Carol Myles, and children's show Rikalandia (hosted by Sandra Zaiter). One notable 1971 show was María, with Lucy Boscana. The station continued some programming from Ponce, including local newscasts. Its news anchor was Rafael L. Torres, in whose name the Southern Puerto Rico Chamber of Commerce later created an Excellence in Journalism award.

Cerro Maravilla incident

In 1978, two pro-independence activists attempted to blow up the WRIK-TV transmitter tower at Cerro Maravilla in an effort to call attention to their cause. Their plan was discovered by police and the two young men were ambushed by police at the peak during their operation. They were arrested and then murdered by the police while still in their custody at the peak.

Teleluz (1979–1987)
In 1979, WRIK-TV was acquired by Puerto Rican producer Tommy Muñiz, owner of AM radio station WLUZ (or Radio Luz); its callsign was subsequently changed to WLUZ-TV (branded as "Teleluz") on March 28, 1979.

Programs shown during this era included a continuation of Sandra Zaiter's children's show and live, low-budgeted professional boxing telecasts from around Puerto Rico on Saturday nights. Boxers who fought on Teleluz frequently included Julian and Rafi Solis, Felix Trinidad Sr. and Victor Callejas.

SuperSiete / Teleisla (1987–present)
Financial troubles forced Muñiz to sell the station to Malrite Communications Group for $1.3 million in 1985. In 1987, the station was rebranded as SuperSiete, and on February 18, 1987, the station changed its call letters to WSTE.

The station experienced limited success at the time using colorful motion graphics and a new logo as well as major advertising in newspapers, and televising popular American sitcoms of the time, such as The Fresh Prince of Bel-Air and The Simpsons, along with major Hollywood movies. It also was acknowledged for its children's show El Show de Burbujita y Bolillo, produced by Milly Cangiano, and its Saturday morning cartoons. Around this time, one of Puerto Rico's longest-running shows, No te Duermas with Antonio Sánchez El Gangster, began airing on channel 7 as well. WSTE also produced a successful game show, La Hora de Oro with Hector Marcano and Sánchez, and two family-oriented sitcoms, Maripili and El Cuartel de la Risa. SuperSiete also broadcast five daily news segments named Noticapsulas (literal translation: news capsules) hosted by news reporter Doris Torres.

In 1991, Malrite bought WLII-TV and WSUR-TV and sold WSTE to Siete Grande Television, Inc., owned by Florida entrepreneur Jerry Hartman. WSTE was then branded as "El Nuevo SuperSiete" ("The New SuperSeven"). During the 1990s, WSTE was rebranded as "Tele-Isla" during prime time hours. Due to the failure of the new programming, and the lack of full island coverage by WLII at the time, WSTE began re-broadcasting WLII's prime time programming mainly for the western and central areas of Puerto Rico.

In 1995, WLII entered into an affiliation agreement with WORA-TV. This created a conflict with the FCC, as WLII's programming was being rebroadcast by two different stations across the island; WLII and WSTE in the north, WSUR-TV and WSTE in the south, and WSTE, WNJX-TV and WORA-TV in the west. During this time, the channel proudly showed its coverage channels on its "ident", as 11-9-7-5-22. After admonishment by the FCC, WLII dropped WSTE and WNJX-TV coverage.

After that point (sometime in 1995) and to this day, the station mostly airs infomercials and locally-produced advertisements for car dealerships. The station aired horse racing from Hipodromo Camarero from 2013 to 2020.

On March 23, 2007, Siete Grande Television, Inc. announced it would sell WSTE to Univision Communications. The sale was approved by the FCC on October 11, 2007. On June 23, 2009, the station's call letters were revised to WSTE-DT.

The channel's SuperSiete "ident" animation, logo, and name survived for over 25 years, dating back to 1987. A new logo with the Teleisla branding was introduced a few months before the FCC-mandated digital transition date of June 12, 2009. On January 2, 2012, WSTE-DT introduced a new logo in the form of a four-color clover (orange representing morning, green representing afternoon, violet representing weekend, and blue representing nightly programming). The station also expanded its broadcast day to 1:00 a.m. On November 1, 2012, Dish Network began carrying WSTE-DT on channel 12. In early 2016, WSTE-DT expanded its broadcast schedule to 24 hours a day, and adding the health program Hablando de Salud from 1:00 a.m. to 7:00 a.m.

Technical information

Subchannels
The station's digital signal is multiplexed:

Analog-to-digital conversion
WSTE shut down its analog signal, over VHF channel 7, at noon on June 12, 2009, the official date in which full-power television stations in the United States transitioned from analog to digital broadcasts under federal mandate. The station's digital signal relocated from its pre-transition VHF channel 8 to channel 7 for its post-transition operations.

Transmitter facilities
To effectively cover all of Puerto Rico, WSTE used booster-type translator facilities across the island prior to the analog shutdown. In order for this booster system to work without any interference, WSTE's main transmitter had to be kept silent. The Ponce area was thus served from an auxiliary station transmitting at 100 kW. WSTE now uses a five-site, digital distributed transmission system to cover the island as the booster system had done before it.

Notes

References

External links
 A history of television in Puerto Rico Archived at WayBack Machine of 15 January 2008.
 WRIK-TV's (Rikavision's) rooster logo in 1976 Archived at WayBack Machine on 24 February 2011.
 WRIK-TV at Edificio Raluan Darlington, Calle Marina, Ponce

Television channels and stations established in 1958
1958 establishments in Puerto Rico
Television stations in Ponce, Puerto Rico
Independent television stations in the United States
Television stations in Puerto Rico